The  were a class of two heavy cruisers which saw service with the Imperial Japanese Navy during World War II. Both vessels of this class were sunk in 1942 during the Guadalcanal campaign.

Design
The Furutaka-class cruisers were the first heavy cruisers in the Imperial Japanese Navy (IJN), also referred to as "A class" cruisers by the IJN. Like the cruiser , their design was the work of Constructor Captain Yuzuru Hiraga, assisted by Lt. Cmdr. Kikuo Fujimoto.

Designed to beat the U.S.  and the British s, they were as fast as the Omahas (and nearly 4 knots faster than the Hawkins class), while firing a heavier broadside, and carrying a larger torpedo battery than either one.

Their flush deck resulted in both weight savings and increased strength by allowing the hull's longitudinal members to be continuous. As with Yūbari, the design featured side and deck armour integrated into the ship's structure, saving additional weight.

Despite the weight-saving efforts, as built Kako was more than 900 tons heavier than her design weight. As a result, draft was increased by more than 1 metre, subsequently reducing top speed, and the height of the belt armour above the waterline. The portholes of the lowest-level crew quarters were near enough to the waterline that they needed to be closed when the ships were at sea, reducing ventilation and making the living spaces less habitable.

They were the first of the IJN cruisers to feature a substantial bridge, with six distinct levels, providing support for navigation, fire control, communication and command.

Due to the high freeboard of these ships, mounting the torpedo tubes on the main deck would have caused the torpedoes to enter the water at too steep an angle. Instead, they were mounted on the middle deck in three pairs of fixed tubes on each side.

Modernization
Japanese naval strategists since the early 20th century had planned for a defensive war in the Pacific, with the U.S. Navy as their main opponent. To take advantage of their superior long-range torpedoes, and offset the numerical superiority the U.S. Navy enjoyed, they extensively trained their crews in night torpedo tactics. In 1930, the Naval General Staff, further concerned by the limitations on the size of their navy by the London Naval Treaty won approval for an extensive modernization program of the "A class" cruisers. Planned upgrades to the ships included the latest weapons, protection, fire control systems, and communication equipment.

From 1931 to 1933 the two ships had their four original anti-aircraft guns replaced by improved 12 cm high-angle electro-hydraulically operated guns, with directors and range finders for them. The original airplane takeoff platform was replaced with a catapult for a reconnaissance seaplane.

They were substantially rebuilt in 1936-1937 (Kako) and 1937-1939 (Furutaka) as follows:

The six single  main battery was replaced by three twin-turrets housing the /50-cal guns. Light anti-aircraft protection was augmented with eight 25 mm automatic cannons in four twin mounts. The six pairs (three per side) of fixed torpedo tubes mounted on the middle deck were replaced with two quadruple mounts using the powerful Type 93 torpedo, located on the upper deck, one on each side of the catapult.

The bridge structure was completely rebuilt to accommodate the latest rangefinders and fire control equipment for the main battery, antiaircraft and torpedoes. Platforms were redesigned for aircraft spotters.

The twelve original mixed-fuel boilers were replaced by 10 large oil-fired units, along with a redesign of all the boiler rooms, and replacement of coal bunkers with fuel-oil tanks.

All of the new equipment resulted in increased electrical power requirements, so three more generators were added to increase power output from 315 kW to 885 kW.

These modifications added 560 tons to the ships. To prevent the draft from increasing even more, and to improve stability, bulges were added, simultaneously enhancing antitorpedo protection.

Ships in class

References

Sources

External links

 CombinedFleet.com: Furutaka-class Heavy cruisers

Cruiser classes
 
Cruisers of the Imperial Japanese Navy
Ships built in Japan